Propionibacterium acnes type zappae is a gram-positive, anaerobic, and endophytic bacterium species of Propionibacterium. It has recently been discovered in an interkingdom bacterial transfer with grapevine plants (Vitis vinifera), which is unexpected because P. acne is found on human skin. The age of P. zappae dates back to about 7,500 years ago, an age that reflects the early domestication of grapevine. The bacterium colonizes in the bark tissue and the pith of the grapevine plant. P. zappae has endophytic characteristics which suggests that the bacterium has adapted to its new grapevine host as well as formed an endocellular symbiosis with the plant.

P. acnes type zappae was named after the Italian term "zappa" (meaning hoe) and as a tribute to musician Frank Zappa who wrote about "sand-blasted zits". The unconventional behavior of this bacteria and its unique habitat caused scientists to immediately think of Zappa and name the bacteria after him.

References

Propionibacteriales